Darniyan or Darnian may refer to:
 Darnian, Fars
 Darniyan, Hamadan
 Darniyan, Kerman

See also
 Darinan (disambiguation)